Nicolae Zuluf (born 3 April 1988) is a Romanian footballer who plays for FC Bolintin Malu Spart 2017.

External links
 

People from Ilfov County
1988 births
Living people
Romanian footballers
Association football midfielders
CS Brănești players
CS Mioveni players
CS Concordia Chiajna players
CS Afumați players
Liga I players
CS Turnu Severin players